Jasna Žalica (born 1968) is a Bosnian actress. She has appeared in more than sixteen films since 1997.

Selected filmography

Film

Television

References

External links

1968 births
Living people
Bosnia and Herzegovina film actresses